This is a list of reptiles of Mongolia.

Family Gekkonidae 
 Kaspischer even-fingered gecko or squeaky pygmy gecko (Alsophylax pipiens)
 Yangihissar gecko (Tenuidactylus elongatus)
 Przewalski's wonder gecko or plate-tailed gecko (Teratoscincus przewalskii)

Family Agamidae 

 Mongolian agama or Mongolian rock agama (Paralaudakia stoliczkana)
 Sunwatcher toad-head agama (Phrynocephalus helioscopus)
 Tuva toad-head agama (Phrynocephalus versicolor)

Family Lacertidae 

 Mongolian racerunner (Eremias argus)
 Stepperunner or arguta (Eremias arguta)
 Dzungarian racerunner (Eremias dzungarica)
 Multi-oscillated racerunner (Eremias multiocellata)
 Gobi racerunner (Eremias przewalskii)
 Variegated racerunner (Eremias vermiculata)
 Sand lizard (Lacerta agilis)
 Viviparous lizard or common lizard (Zootoca vivipara)

Family Boidae 
 Tatary sand boa (Eryx tataricus)

Family Colubridae 
 Slender racer (Orientocoluber spinalis)
 Steppes rat snake, Dione snake or Pallas' coluber (Elaphe dione)
 Amur rat snake, great black snake, Manchurian black, Siberian rat snake or Russian rat snake (Elaphe schrenckii)
 European grass snake or grass snake (Natrix natrix)
 Steppe ribbon racer (Psammophis lineolatus)

Family Viperidae 
 Halys pit viper or Asian viper (Gloydius halys)
 Ussuri mamushi (Gloydius ussuriensis)
 Adder or common northern viper (Vipera berus)

Sources 

 Mongolian Red List of Reptiles and Amphibians. Zoological Society of London, Regent’s Park, London, NW1 4RY, 2006

Mongolia
 List
Reptiles
Mongolia